Conyza (horseweed, butterweed or fleabane) is a genus of flowering plants in the family Asteraceae.

They are native to tropical and warm temperate regions throughout the world, and also north into cool temperate regions in North America and eastern Asia. The New World species of the genus are closely related to Erigeron (also known as fleabanes).

The species are annual or perennial herbaceous plants, rarely shrubs, growing to 1–2 m tall. The stems are erect, branched, with alternate leaves. The flowers are produced in inflorescences, with several inflorescences loosely clustered on each stem.

Many species of the genus Conyza are ruderal species and some have been found to be resistant to the herbicide glyphosate.

 Species

References

External links
 Germplasm Resources Information Network: Conyza
 Chinese plant names: Conyza

Astereae
Asteraceae genera
Ruderal species